Fussball Club Rapperswil-Jona, was founded in 1928 and is now the largest sports club in the Oberer Lake / Linth area. After achieving promotion in June 2017, the first team will played in the Swiss Challenge League, the second tier of Swiss football, for the first time in club history. After two seasons in the Challenge League, they were relegated back to the Swiss Promotion League.

Squad
As of 6 September 2022.

External links
  

Football clubs in Switzerland
Association football clubs established in 1928
1928 establishments in Switzerland